"Sgt. Rock (Is Going to Help Me)" is a song by the British band XTC. Written by frontman Andy Partridge, it was released as the band's 12th single in December 1980, charting in the UK singles chart at No. 16 on 21 February 1981, being XTC's biggest single chart success to this date. The song also reached the Irish charts, peaking at No. 20.

The band performed the song on Top of the Pops and the Saturday morning show Multi-Coloured Swap Shop. The tune itself was recorded at Townhouse Studios, London in June 1980. The 7" single is packed with a poster, showing a Sgt. Rock comic. The song is featured on the compilation albums Waxworks: Some Singles 1977–1982, The Compact XTC, and Fossil Fuel: The XTC Singles 1977–92. 

Partridge has since expressed disdain with the song, stating that it "embarrasses the shit out of me. Of all the tunes that I've written, that made it to tape, this makes me cringe the worse. It's not the music, that's solid enough. All the instruments in the track mesh nicely enough, but the lyrical sentiment, oh dear. It was supposed to be ironic, you know, nerdy comic fan imagines two dimensional hero can help him with his unsuccessful chat up technique. It did not work. It just came out limply crap. Virgin insisted it be included in this set, otherwise I'd gladly erase it from our history. We all make mistakes".

Track listing
 "Sgt. Rock (Is Going to Help Me)" [single edit] (Andy Partridge) (3:36)
 "Living Through Another Cuba" (Andy Partridge)/"Generals And Majors" (Colin Moulding) [live medley] (7:52)

Personnel
Terry Chambers – drums, vibraslap
Dave Gregory – guitars
Colin Moulding – vocals, Epiphone Newport bass
Andy Partridge – vocals, guitar, synth

Charts

References

External links
 Entry on Discogs
 Sgt. Rock (Is Going to Help Me) on Chalkhills.org

XTC songs
1980 songs
1980 singles
Songs written by Andy Partridge
Virgin Records singles
Songs about comics
Songs about superheroes
Song recordings produced by Steve Lillywhite
Songs about fictional male characters